The Qazis of Hyderabad, Sindh  (also spelled "Kazis") are an established Pakistani and Sindhi political family from Hyderabad, Sindh.  Most, though not all, members of the family that were in politics were known by their title, Qazi, which is the name given to certain Judges under Islamic Law, instead of their last name "Abbasi".  The family has been involved in politics for at least five generations.

The Qazi/Abbasi family originally hailed from Sehwan in Sindh and migrated to Hyderabad when Qazi Abdul Qayyum settled there.  Qazi Abdul Qayyum's brother, Hakeem Fatheh Muhammad Sehwani, who chose to use the title Hakeem, settled in Karachi after leaving Sehwan, where he established another branch of the family.

In journalistic circles, the family publishes several Sindhi language newspapers including the Daily Ibrat.  In addition, the family served the journalistic community through its involvement in the All Pakistan Newspapers Society.  Qazi Abdul Majeed Abid was its Secretary-General thrice, Qazi Aslam Akbar was its Secretary-General four times, and Qazi Asad Abid was its Secretary-General an unprecedented nine times.

The Qazis have been elected from many constituencies outside of Hyderabad.  For example, Pir Mazhar Ul Haq has traditionally been elected from Dadu and Fahmida Mirza and Zulfiqar Mirza from Badin.

Members of the family that have held office have included the following:

First Generation

 Qazi Abdul Qayyum Abbasi, the first Muslim President of the Hyderabad Municipality (pictured immediately below)

Second Generation

 Kazi Muhammad Akbar, former Sindh Provincial Home Minister, former Sindh Provincial Finance Minister, former Sindh Provincial Information Minister, former Sindh Provincial Public Works Minister, former Ambassador of Pakistan, and son of Qazi Abdul Qayyum
 Kazi Abdul Majeed Abid (Qazi Abid), former Federal Minister for Agriculture, former Federal Minister for Water and Power, former Federal Minister for Information and Broadcasting, former Federal Minister for Education, former Member of the National Assembly, former Sindh Provincial Communications Minister, and son of Qazi Abdul Qayyum
 Kazi Muhammad Azam, a three time former Member of Parliament (West Pakistan National Assembly) (in 1965,1971 and 1977) and son of Qazi Abdul Qayyum
 Hakeem Muhammad Ahsan, first Mayor of Karachi, Pakistan following independence of Pakistan in 1947, former Ambassador of Pakistan to numerous countries, former Senior Sindh Provincial Minister and Sindh Provincial Health Minister, and nephew of Qazi Abdul Qayyum and son of Hakeem Fatheh Muhammad Sehwani

Third Generation

 Fahmida Mirza, former Speaker of the National Assembly, former Acting President of Pakistan, three time Member of the National Assembly, and daughter of Qazi Abid. She is currently Federal Minister for Inter Provincial Coordination. 
 Qazi Asad Abid, former Member of the National Assembly and son of Qazi Abid 
 Ameena Ashraf, former Member of the National Assembly and the Sindh Provincial Assembly and daughter of Qazi Muhammad Akbar
 Zulfiqar Mirza, former Sindh Provincial Home Minister, former Member of the National Assembly, and nephew of Qazi Abid, Qazi Azam, and Qazi Akbar (related through Mother)
 Muhammad Aslam Kazi, Current owner and C.E.O of KTN, KTN news and Kashish, Son of Kazi Muhammad Akbar.
 Muhammad Ayub Kazi, Current owner and C.E.O of Daily Kawish Sindhi Newspaper and Daily Koshish Newspaper, Son of Kazi Muhammad Akber.
 Muhammad Ali Kazi, Current owner and C.E.O of Time News and Pehnji Akhbar (Newspaper), Son of Kazi Muhammad Akbar.

Fourth Generation

 Pir Mazhar Ul Haq, former Senior Sindh Provincial Minister and Sindh Provincial Education Minister, former Sindh Provincial Housing and Works Minister, former Sindh Provincial Law Minister, and grandson of Qazi Muhammad Akbar (related through Mother)

 Kazi Ashad Abbasi, member hyderabad  Cantonment Board from Ward 4 and opposition leader plus two times elected member and grandson of Kazi Akbar.

 Muhammad Ather Kazi, C.F.O of KTN news and KTN, Son of Aslam Kazi and Grandson of Kazi Muhammad Akbar.
 Kazi Muhammad Akber, Host and Owner of Kya Kahe Ga Kazi Podcast, author of Stories From Karachi by Kazi Akber, Son of Ayub Kazi and Grandson of Kazi Muhammad Akbar.
 Kazi Abeer, Part-Owner of Diraan World Of Cuisine Restaurant and Owner and proprietor of Abear_fit, Son of Ayub Kazi and Grandson of Kazi Muhammad Akbar.
 Ushah Ayub Kazi, Owner and proprietor of Womens Own Magazine, Wiff Blends, an Author as well as Part-Owner of Diraan World Of Cuisine Restaurant, Daughter Of Ayub Kazi and Granddaughter of Kazi Muhammad Akbar.
 Unsa Ayub Kazi, Part-Owner of Diraan World Of Cuisine Restaurant, Daughter of Ayub Kazi and Granddaughter of Kazi Muhammad Akbar.

Fifth Generation

 Marvi Mazhar, a former Member of the Provincial Assembly in Sindh and daughter of Pir Mazhar Ul Haq
 Hasnain Mirza, a current Member of the Provincial Assembly in Sindh and son of Zulfikar Mirza
 Pir Majeeb Ul Haq, a current Member of the Provincial Assembly in Sindh and son of Pir Mazhar Ul Haq.

 Kazi Faris son of Kazi ashhad Abbasi and great grandson of kazi muhammad akbar currently a civil engineer 

 Farheen Ather Kazi Daughter of Muhammad Ather Kazi, Granddaughter of Muhammad Aslam Kazi and Great Granddaughter of Kazi Muhammad Akbar.
United States Expansion

The Family has also expanded to the United States.
  
 Qazi Azfar Sonny Abbasi, also a grandson of Qazi Abjul Majid Abid, has been active in Democratic Party Politics for over twenty-five years in supporting various candidates at all levels. On July 13, 2018, Sonny was appointed to the Virginia Board of Housing and Community Development by Governor of Virginia, Ralph Northam.  On July 22, 2019, he was elected Vice Chairman of the Virginia Board of Housing and Community Development, only a year after first being appointed.  He has since been elected Chairman of the Virginia Board of Housing and Community Development.  More recently, his Afghan-American wife, Marzia Nawroz Abbasi, was appointed by Governor Northam to the Virginia Real Estate Board.  Marzia is the granddaughter of Muhammad Nawroz, who served as a Federal Minister in Afghanistan and Speaker of the Afghan Parliament at the same time Hakeem Ahsan was Ambassador to Afghanistan from Pakistan.

See also 
 Fahmida Mirza
 Pir Mazhar Ul Haq
 Qazi Asad Abid
 Qazi Abdul Majeed Abid
 Political families of Pakistan

External links
 Hyderabad: politically alive https://web.archive.org/web/20160303183923/http://jang.com.pk/thenews/oct2008-weekly/nos-19-10-2008/kol.htm#4
 NA elects first woman speaker by two-thirds majority http://www.dawn.com/2008/03/20/top1.htm
 Dr. Fehmida Mirza to act as President during absence abroad of President Zardari https://web.archive.org/web/20120219231541/http://www.app.com.pk/en_/index.php?option=com_content&task=view&id=66889&Itemid=2
 PROFILE: Dr Fahmida Mirza wife of Dr. Zulfiqar Mirza https://web.archive.org/web/20090211061645/http://www.sindhtimes.com/news/121/ARTICLE/2095/2008-11-29.html
 https://www.governor.virginia.gov/newsroom/all-releases/2018/july/headline-827318-en.html

Political families of Pakistan
Politics of Sindh
Hyderabad District, Pakistan